Mel Walker may refer to:

 Mel Walker (athlete) (1914–2000), American high jumper
 Mel Walker (musician) (1929–1964), American R&B singer